Kim Ho-Gyu (born 14 November 1950) represented North Korea in archery at the 1972 Summer Olympic Games.

Olympics 

She scored 2369 points in the women's individual event and finished 7th.

References

External links 

 Profile on worldarchery.org

1950 births
Living people
North Korean female archers
Olympic archers of North Korea
Archers at the 1972 Summer Olympics